The brown mantella (Mantella betsileo) is a species of frog in the family Mantellidae.
It is endemic to Madagascar.
Its natural habitats are subtropical or tropical dry forests, dry savanna, moist savanna, subtropical or tropical dry shrubland, rivers, freshwater marshes, intermittent freshwater marshes, rural gardens, heavily degraded former forest, ponds, and canals and ditches.
It is threatened by habitat loss.

References

Mantella
Amphibians described in 1872
Endemic frogs of Madagascar
Taxonomy articles created by Polbot
Taxa named by Alfred Grandidier